Payday Records is a New York-based hiphop label that was launched in 1992 by Patrick Moxey. The label began in association with FFRR/London Records, and released in the UK and Europe via London/PolyGram Records. Artists launched via Payday Records include Jeru the Damaja, Jay Z, Mos Def (via his first group U.T.D.), Showbiz & A.G., WC and the Madd Circle. Other associated productions include the works of DJ Premier and Guru of Gang Starr.

The label officially relaunched on November 2, 2017, with "Our Streets," a record by DJ Premier and A$AP Ferg. They have also released Pell's girasoul EP.

Payday Records’ 2017-present catalog is distributed by Ultra Records.

Music videos 
Payday has worked with world renowned graffiti artists, photographers, and video makers- including Haze, Nick Quested, Andrew Dosumnu among others- to produce visual content for its releases.

Current artists 
 DJ Premier
 OJ Da Juiceman
 Pell
 Gloss Gang
 BBY GOYARD
 RetcH
 Slimesito
 BlumBros
 Ishawna

Former artists 
 1st Down
 Big Red
 Big Shug
 DJ Crystl
Gang Starr
 Group Home
 Jay-Z
 Jeru the Damaja
 Junior Tucker
 Kaliphz
 M-Beat
 Mass 187
 Motif
 O.C.
 Radamiz
 Raazda Rukkuz
 Screechy Dan
 Showbiz and A.G.
 Spax
 Urban Species
 Urban Thermo Dynamics
 The Watts Prophets
 WC
 WC and the Maad Circle

Discography 
Full Payday Records discography.

References

Record labels established in 1992
Hip hop record labels